The Stavanger Drive Shopping Area (also known as Cabot Square Power Centre) is a commercial district in the northeastern part of St. John's, Newfoundland and Labrador, Canada. It is located at the intersection of Torbay Road and Stavanger Drive, just north of Route 1 (Trans-Canada Highway or Outer Ring Road). The district first opened in 1995 with stores of Costco (then known as Price Club) and Zellers. As of 2015, the original area bordering Stavanger Drive has become almost entirely saturated with stores, and most further expansions are occurring to its northwest, around Hebron Way. It is accessible via two interchanges off Route 1, which are Exit 48 (Torbay Road) and Exit 49 (Aberdeen Avenue). The area is located close to St. John's International Airport.

Tenants

Other retailers
 A Buck or Two
 Addition Elle
 Bombay
 La-Z-Boy Furniture Galleries
 Mark's
 Michaels
 Old Navy
 Pier 1 Imports
 Princess Auto
 Reitmans
 Royal Bank of Canada
 The Shoe Company
 SportChek
 Petsmart
 Dollarama
 Rona
 Bulk Barn
 le boudoir

Restaurants
 Boston Pizza
 Quesada Burritos & Tacos
 McDonald's

Hotels
 Hampton Inn & Suites

Neighbourhoods in St. John's, Newfoundland and Labrador
Shopping districts and streets in Canada